DSZ may refer to:
Armed Forces Delegation for Poland (Delegatura Sił Zbrojnych na Kraj), a Polish anticommunist resistance organization formed 1945
Deutsche Shanghai Zeitung, a German-language newspaper published in Shanghai, China, associated with the Nazi Party
Deutsche Soldaten Zeitung, an extreme right German newspaper (1951–1963)
Women's Democratic Party,  a women's rights political organization founded in Zagreb in 2004
Democratic Party of Greens, Czech political party